Presidential may refer to:
 "Presidential" (song), a 2005 song by YoungBloodZ
 Presidential Airways (charter), an American charter airline based in Florida
 Presidential Airways (scheduled), an American passenger airline active in the 1980s
 Presidential Range, a range in the White Mountains of New Hampshire, US
 Presidential Range (Green Mountains), a mountain range in Vermont, US

See also
 President (disambiguation)